La Jonquera is a municipality in the comarca of  l'Alt Empordà, in Catalonia, Spain. It is situated next to the border with Northern Catalonia, nowadays France, opposite the municipality of Le Perthus.

History
The area has always been an important pass through the Pyrenees. A contemporary motorway runs not far from the ancient Roman road, the Via Augusta. Not far from there is an altar erected by Pompey at the Coll de Panissars.

La Jonquera was the site of a conflict involving the retreating French crusaders in 1285 that ended in their defeat.

Geography

Civil parishes
La Jonquera (2,888 inhabitants in the village) has 4 civil parishes (poblaciones). The village of Els Límits is situated on the French-Spanish border, contiguous to its French twin town, Le Perthus.

Interesting places
 Church of Santa Maria.
 Ruins of Santa Maria de Panissars (mediaeval Benedictine monastery), in the coll de Panissars.
 Ruins of the castell de Rocabertí.
 Castell de Canadal, with the church of Santa Cristina or Sant Jaume de Canadal (c. IX).
 Romanesque churches (Sant Pere del Pla de l'Arca and Sant Martí del Forn del Vidre (10th century), and Santa Llúcia, Sant Miquel de Solans and Sant Julià dels Torts (12th century).
 Porta Catalana (work of Josep Lluís Sert), in the border.
 Several megalithic monuments (dolmens and menhirs).

Prostitution
The New York Times reported that one of Europe's largest brothels opened in La Jonquera in 2010, taking advantage of Europe's open borders and "lax laws".  Many of its clients reportedly come from France, where prostitution was made illegal in April 2016. According to the paper, "Advocates and police officials say that most of the women are controlled by illegal networks — they are modern-day slaves."

Forest fires
The area around La Jonquera was seriously affected by fatal wildfires that devastated large swathes of forestry in northern Catalonia in July 2012.

Demography

References

 Panareda Clopés, Josep Maria; Rios Calvet, Jaume; Rabella Vives, Josep Maria (1989). Guia de Catalunya, Barcelona: Caixa de Catalunya.  (Spanish).  (Catalan).

External links 

Ajuntament de La Jonquera
 Government data pages 

Municipalities in Alt Empordà
Populated places in Alt Empordà